Bosnian Muslims can refer to:

 adherents of Islam in Bosnia and Herzegovina in general, or more specific - just in the region of Bosnia
 former colloquial designation for ethnic Bosniaks of Bosnia and Herzegovina, who are by majority adherents of Islam
 designation for the ethnic Muslims (Muslimani) in Bosnia and Herzegovina

See also 
 Muslims in Bosnia and Herzegovina (disambiguation)
 Croatian Muslims (disambiguation)
 Serbian Muslims (disambiguation)